Wieland Kuijken (born Dilbeek, 31 August 1938) is a Belgian musician and player of the viola da gamba and baroque cello.

Biography
Kuijken started his career in music in 1952 with the Brussels Alariusensemble of which he formed part until 1972. In addition, he played with the Ensemble Musique Nouvelle which propagated avant-garde music throughout Europe.

In 1972 the ensemble La Petite Bande was established and later the Kuijken Strijkkwartet (Kuijken String Quartet). Kuijken has recorded numerous works of chamber music with Gustav Leonhardt, Frans Brüggen and Alfred Deller. Today he is one of the most sought-after Early Music performers of his generation on the baroque cello and viola da gamba.

Wieland Kuijken is gamba teacher at the conservatories of Brussels and The Hague and regular jury member of international competitions.

Kuijken has two brothers, Sigiswald and Barthold, who are also eminent musicians and are known for playing baroque music on authentic instruments.  Sigiswald is a violinist and Barthold a flautist and recorder player. His third brother is Professor Eckhart Kuijken, former director of the Flemish Institute for Nature Conservation and a professor at Groningen University. He also has a fourth brother, Oswald Kuijken, who is a famous visual artist.

External links 
 Short Biography (in French) 
 Official site of La Petite Bande
 Page on the Kuijken Strijkkwartet (Kuijken String Quartet)(in Dutch)

1938 births
Living people
Belgian conductors (music)
Male conductors (music)
Belgian musicians
People from Dilbeek
Belgian performers of early music
Academic staff of the Royal Conservatory of Brussels
Viol players
21st-century Belgian musicians
20th-century Belgian musicians
20th-century conductors (music)
21st-century conductors (music)
20th-century Belgian male musicians
21st-century male musicians